The Army of West Tennessee was a short-lived Confederate army led by Maj. Gen. Earl Van Dorn, which fought principally in the Second Battle of Corinth.

The army was organized from elements of the Army of the West on September 28, 1862, with Earl Van Dorn its first and only commander. On November 24, 1862, Adjutant General Samuel Cooper issued a ruling that the army's name and function were "improper" and on December 9, 1862, the units of the Army of West Tennessee were merged into the Army of Mississippi under Lt. Gen. John C. Pemberton.

History
As part of his preparations for the Perryville offensive, General Braxton Bragg divided Mississippi into several commands: Major General Earl Van Dorn was given command of the District of the Mississippi, centered in Vicksburg, and Major General Sterling Price was given the District of the Tennessee, covering northwestern Mississippi and northeastern Alabama. Bragg expected Price to prevent the Union forces of Ulysses S. Grant and William Rosecrans in western Tennessee from reinforcing the Union forces in Kentucky, and expected Van Dorn to cooperate with Price. Price interpreted Bragg's orders as to mean that he was to attack the Union forces. Van Dorn, however, choose to move against the Union forces threatening Vicksburg and launched an attack on Baton Rouge, Louisiana, which failed; he then proposed a joint attack with Price on Corinth. Price by this time had decided not to wait for Van Dorn but moved against Iuka, capturing the town on September 14. Two Union columns, commanded by Grant and Rosecrans, converged on Iuka on September 19; Price attacked Rosecrans' force and due to poor communications and an acoustic shadow Grant failed to attack in concert. When he discovered that Grant was approaching from the northwest, Price decided to retreat before he was surrounded.

Price united with Van Dorn at Ripley, Mississippi, on September 28 and placed himself under his command. Price's army was redesignated as Price's Corps; the other parts of Van Dorn's army were the forces of his District of the Mississippi, Mansfield Lovell's infantry division and a small cavalry brigade commanded by Colonel W. H. Jackson (this force reported directly to Van Dorn). Although several officers, including Price and Lovell, were opposed to the plan, they still followed Van Dorn's orders. The march began on September 29 and the Confederates arrived outside Corinth on October 3.

The two-day Battle of Corinth began on October 3, with Confederate attacks overrunning the first line of Union entrenchments north of Corinth. Much of the fighting was done by Price's corps on the Confederate left; Lovell on the Confederate right overran the initial Union positions and then halted, perhaps due to his objections to the campaign. Price had to halt his attacks close to dusk due to increasing disorganization in his divisions and to Lovell's inactivity. The next day, Van Dorn planned another series of attacks, starting at daylight with Louis Hebert's division of Price's corps on the left flank, with the remaining units continuing the attack. However, the attack was delayed when Hebert reported himself sick and his successor had to be informed of the attack plan and move his division into position. Price's two divisions were able to capture several parts of the Union second line of fortifications, with some units entering the town of Corinth itself, but Union counterattacks forced the Confederates back. Lovell failed to attack at all.

Following the repulse of Price's attacks, Van Dorn decided to retreat towards the Davis Bridge over the Hatchie River that evening, with Price's corps in front and Lovell's division serving as rear guard; he briefly considered attacking Corinth again from the southwest but was talked out of it by Price. The next day, the Confederates learned that another Union force commanded by Stephen A. Hurlbut was approaching from the west towards the Davis Bridge, thus cutting off the Confederate line of retreat. One of Price's divisions was assigned to delay Hurlbut until the rest of the army reached another crossing six miles to the south; during the resulting engagement, the Confederates were able to delay Hurlbut sufficiently to enable their escape. Van Dorn reached Ripley on October 7, but due to the poor condition of his army and a shortage of supplies at Ripley he decided to continue onto Holly Springs.

During the Corinth campaign, Price lost over 3,700 casualties out of 13,800 men, nearly 35 percent of his force; Lovell, by contrast, lost only 570 out of 7,000 men. Both Lovell and Van Dorn were blamed for the Confederate defeat, with Lovell especially criticized by Price's troops. In December, Van Dorn's command was abolished and merged with Price's command into a new Department of Mississippi and East Louisiana commanded by John C. Pemberton; Van Dorn himself was reassigned to a cavalry corps.

See also
 Second Corinth Confederate order of battle

Notes

References
 Cozzens, Peter, The Darkest Days of the War: The Battles of Iuka and Corinth, University of North Carolina Press, 1997, p. 327.
 Eicher, John H., and Eicher, David J., Civil War High Commands, Stanford University Press, 2001, p. 892.
 Civil War Armies

1862 establishments in the Confederate States of America
1862 disestablishments in the Confederate States of America
West Tennessee